Casasia domingensis is a plant native to the Dominican Republic,  it is a part of the family Rubiaceae.

Etymology
The species has been given the specific epithet "domingensis", as it occurs on the island of Hispaniola. This island was historically called Santo Domingo, or Saint-Domingue.

References

dominegensis